Dhivehi League was a former Maldivian association football league, organized by the Football Association of Maldives. Every year, 8 teams competed in the league, which was the top level in the Maldivian football league system.

Format 
Dhivehi League consists of 3 rounds of teams that play a round robin format, which means that each team plays each other twice; once at home and once as visitor. In the 3rd round only the top 6 teams will play while the lower 2 teams will be relegated.

Every year, 8 teams compete in this high-profile competition, the top level in Maldives.

Dhivehi League qualification methods:

Zone 1–8 consists of the Atolls and the two finalists of Zone 1–8 Final Tournament and the top 2 teams of Zone 9 Qualification (Malé League, First Division) participate in Dhivehi League along with the 4 best-finishers in the Dhivehi League of the previous year.  Finalists of the Second Division will get the chance to promote to the first division after a qualification round with the lowest ranked two teams of the Dhivehi League.

On 22 December 2014:

The FAM normalisation committee formed by FIFA has decided to rebrand Dhivehi League as Dhivehi Premier League.
FAM have decided to play two rounds in the league from 2015, instead of three rounds, the bottom team will relegate to the second division automatically and the champion of the second division will qualify for the league while runner-up of second division and second last placed team of the premier league will play a play-off match to secure a spot on the top league.

Past winners

2000: Victory Sports Club
2001: Club Valencia
2002: Club Valencia
2003: Club Valencia
2004: Club Valencia
2005: Hurriyya SC
2006: New Radiant SC
2007: Victory Sports Club
2008: Club Valencia
2009: VB Sports Club
2010: VB Sports Club
2011: VB Sports Club
2012: New Radiant SC
2013: New Radiant SC
2014: New Radiant SC

Dhivehi Premier League 
2015: New Radiant SC
2016: Maziya S&RC
2017: New Radiant SC
2018: T.C. Sports Club
2019–20: Maziya S&RC

Dhivehi League all time standings

Rules for classification: 1) points; 2) goal difference; 3) number of goals scored.

Note!
The first year (2000) results and statistics missing.
VB Addu FC statistics included VB Sports & Island FC results.
Thoddoo FC statistics included the results of Kalhaidhoo ZJ.
2015 DPL & 2016 DPLstatistics also included in the table.

Winners of Maldives National Championship
1946: Customs and Naadhee Ahthamadhun (shared)
1947: Naadhee Ahthamadhun
1948: not known
1949: not known
1950: not known
1951: not known
1952: not known
1953: not known
1954: not known
1955: not known
1956: not known
1957: not known
1958: not known
1959: not known
1960: not known
1961: not known
1962: not known
1963: not known
1964: not known
1965: not known
1966: not known
1967: not known
1968: not known
1969: not known
1970: DNC and Zamaanee Club (Male) (shared)
1971: not known
1972: Victory Sports Club and DNC (shared)
1973: not known
1974: ASA Nooraaneemaage
1975: not known
1976: Victory Sports Club
1977: Victory Sports Club
1978: Victory Sports Club
1979: not known
1980: Victory Sports Club
1981: Victory Sports Club
1982: New Radiant SC
1983: Victory Sports Club beat Club Valencia
1984: Victory Sports Club beat New Radiant SC
1985: Victory Sports Club beat New Radiant SC on penalties
1986: Victory Sports Club beat New Radiant SC
1987: New Radiant SC beat Club Valencia on penalties
1988: Victory Sports Club 2-1 Club Lagoons
1989: Club Lagoons 4-3 Victory Sports Club after replay 0-0
1990: New Radiant SC 4-0 Club Valencia
1991: New Radiant SC 2-0 Victory Sports Club after replay 1-1
1992: Victory Sports Club 1-0 New Radiant SC after replay 0-0
1993: Club Valencia 7-0 New Radiant SC
1994: Club Valencia 2-1 New Radiant SC
1995: New Radiant SC 2-1 Club Valencia
1996: Victory Sports Club 2-0 Club Valencia
1997: New Radiant SC 2-1 Hurriyya SC
1998: Club Valencia 2-0 Victory Sports Club after replay 1-1
1999: Club Valencia 2-1 Hurriyya SC
2000: Victory Sports Club 1-0 New Radiant SC
2001: Victory Sports Club 2-1 Club Valencia
2002: Victory Sports Club 4-2 Club Valencia
2003: Victory Sports Club 2-1 Club Valencia
2004: New Radiant SC 1-1 Club Valencia (aet, 6-5 pens)
2005: Victory Sports Club 1-0 New Radiant SC
2006: Victory Sports Club 0-0 Club Valencia (aet, 3-1 pens)
2007: New Radiant SC 3-1 Victory Sports Club
2008: Club Valencia 3-2 Victory Sports Club
2009: Victory Sports Club 2-1 VB Sports
2010: VB Sports 5-2 Victory Sports Club
2011: Victory Sports Club 2-1 (aet) New Radiant SC
2012: New Radiant SC 0-0 Victory Sports Club (aet, 2-1 pens)
2013: New Radiant SC 4-2 (aet) Maziya S&RC
2014: New Radiant SC 1-0 (aet) Club Eagles
2015: Maziya S&RC 3-1 New Radiant SC

Winners of Malé League Championship
2001: Victory Sports Club
2002: Island FC
2003: Victory SC
2004: New Radiant SC
2005: Club Valencia
2006: Victory Sports Club

All-time top scorers

Top scorers by seasons

References 

RSSSF
List of football clubs in Maldives
http://www.maldivesoccer.com/
http://int.soccerway.com/national/maldives/dhiraagu-dhivehi-league/2014/championship-round/r28159/

 
Football leagues in the Maldives
Mald
League